Allan Jay Lichtman (born April 4, 1947) is an American historian who has taught at American University in Washington, D.C. since 1973.

Lichtman created the Keys to the White House model, which he created with Soviet seismologist Vladimir Keilis-Borok in 1981. The model uses 13 True/False criteria to predict whether the candidate of an incumbent party will win or lose the next election for the U.S. president. Using this model, Lichtman has accurately predicted the winner of every U.S. presidential election since 1984. He ran for the U.S. Senate seat from Maryland in 2006, finishing in sixth place in the Democratic primary. In 2017, Lichtman published The Case for Impeachment, laying out multiple arguments for the impeachment of Donald Trump.

Early life
Lichtman was born in the Brownsville neighborhood of Brooklyn in New York City. He graduated from Stuyvesant High School. Lichtman received his B.A. degree from Brandeis University in history in 1967, and graduated Phi Beta Kappa and magna cum laude while also running track and wrestling for the school. In 1973, Lichtman received his Ph.D. from Harvard University as a Graduate Prize Fellow, also in history.

Career

Teaching

Lichtman began teaching at American University in 1973, rising to chair of the History Department, and was named Scholar/Professor of the Year in 1993.

Outside of the classroom, Lichtman has testified as an expert witness on civil rights in more than 70 cases for the U.S. Department of Justice and for civil rights groups such as the NAACP, the Mexican-American Legal Defense and Education Fund and Puerto Rican Legal Defense and Education Fund, and the Southern Poverty Law Center. He also consulted for Vice President Al Gore and Senator Edward Kennedy. He assisted the U.S. Commission on Civil Rights investigation into voting irregularities in Florida during the 2000 election, submitting his statistical analysis of balloting problems. Lichtman concluded "there were major racial disparities in ballot rejection rates".

In the early 1980s while living in California as a visiting professor at the California Institute of Technology, Lichtman had a 17-show stint on the game show Tic Tac Dough. He won $100,000 during his time on the show.

Author and commentator
Lichtman is best known for the "Keys" system, presented in his books The Thirteen Keys to the Presidency and The Keys to the White House. The system uses thirteen historical factors to predict whether the popular vote in the election for President of the United States will be won by the candidate of the party holding the presidency (regardless of whether the president is the candidate). The keys were selected based on their correlations with the presidential election results from 1860 through 1980, using statistical methods adapted from the work of geophysicist Vladimir Keilis-Borok for predicting earthquakes. The system then correctly predicted the popular vote winner in each of the elections between 1984 and 2012, including a correct prediction of Gore as a popular vote winner in 2000. Lichtman has provided commentary for networks and cable channels such as CNN, MSNBC, and Fox News. In the 2020 Presidential Election, Lichtman correctly predicted that Democrat Joe Biden would defeat Republican Donald Trump in both the popular vote and the electoral college.

Nate Silver has criticized Lichtman's "keys", writing that several of the keys are subjective. For example, two of the keys are whether the incumbent has charisma and whether the challenger has charisma. Silver wrote, "it’s awfully easy to describe someone as charismatic when he or she is ahead in the polls — or when you have the advantage of hindsight and know who won an election."

In April 2017, Lichtman authored the book The Case for Impeachment, laying out multiple arguments for the impeachment of Donald Trump. The Financial Times gave The Case for Impeachment a positive review, writing: "Lichtman's powerful book is a reminder that we are only at the start of the Trump investigations." The Washington Post called it "striking to see the full argument unfold". New York Journal of Books recommended it as a resource, "if you are a member of Congress trying to grapple with all that this administration has wrought." The Hill gave the author praise, writing: "Lichtman has written what may be the most important book of the year." CBC News consulted law scholars that said the fulfillment of Lichtman's impeachment prediction was unlikely, especially with a Republican-controlled U.S. House of Representatives. Trump was impeached by the U. S. House of Representatives on December 18, 2019, but acquitted by the U. S. Senate on February 5, 2020.

In 2020, Lichtman published Repeal the Second Amendment. In the book, Lichtman argues that the only way to solve the gun violence epidemic in America is by repealing the Second Amendment to the United States Constitution.

2006 U.S. Senate race in Maryland

Lichtman announced his candidacy for the Democratic nomination for United States Senate from Maryland in the 2006 election to replace Senator Paul Sarbanes; in a playful opening television ad, he pledged not to be a "conventional politician" and jumped into the C&O Canal in a business suit. Lichtman was seen as a long-shot candidate, with low support in polls. He criticized front-runner U.S. Representative Ben Cardin for his votes in favor of funding for the Iraq War. When Lichtman was not invited by the League of Women Voters to the Maryland Public Television debate, he and other excluded candidates (Josh Rales and Dennis F. Rasmussen) protested outside the Baltimore County television studio; Lichtman and his wife were arrested after a confrontation with a security guard. In 2006, both were acquitted on all charges.

Lichtman lost in the primary election to Cardin, receiving 6,919 votes (1.2%), landing him in 6th place in a field of 18. In October 2012, The Washington Post reported that he was still paying off a mortgage he took out in order to help fund his campaign.

Awards and honors
Lichtman has received numerous awards at American University during his career. Most notably, he was named Distinguished Professor of History in 2011 and Outstanding Scholar/Teacher for 1992–93, the highest faculty award at that school. Honors include:
 Sherman Fairchild Distinguished Visiting Scholar, California Institute of Technology, 1980–81
 Top Speaker Award, National Convention of the International Platform Association, 1983, 1984, 1987
 Selected by the Teaching Company as one of America's "Super Star Teachers"
 Outstanding Scholar/Teacher, 1992–93
 Finalist, National Book Critics Circle Award for White Protestant Nation, the Rise of the American Conservative Movement, 2008
 Distinguished Professor of History at American University, 2011
 Winner, National Jewish Book Award, 2013 for "FDR and the Jews," with Richard Breitman
 Finalist for the Los Angeles Times Book Prize, 2013 for "FDR and the Jews," with Richard Breitman

Books
 Historians and the Living Past: The Theory and Practice of Historical Study (Arlington Heights, Ill.: Harlan Davidson, Inc., 1978; with Valerie French)
 Ecological Inference (With Laura Irwin Langbein, Sage Series In Quantitative Applications In The Social Sciences, 1978)
 Your Family History: How to Use Oral History, Personal Family Archives, and Public Documents to Discover Your Heritage (New York: Random House, 1978)
 Prejudice and the Old Politics: The Presidential Election of 1928 (Chapel Hill: University of North Carolina Press, 1979; Lexington Books, 2000)
 Kin and Communities: Families In America (Edited, with Joan Challinor, Washington, D.C.: Smithsonian Press, 1979)
 The Thirteen Keys to the Presidency (Lanham: Madison Books, 1990, With Ken Decell) 
 The Keys to the White House, 1996 Edition (Lanham: Madison Books, 1996; reprint, Lexington Books Edition, 2000) 
 White Protestant Nation: The Rise of the American Conservative Movement, (Finalist for National Book Critics Circle Award in non-fiction, 2008) Grove/Atlantic Press. 
 FDR & the Jews, (Co-authored with Richard Breitman. Harvard University Press, 2013)
 The Case for Impeachment, HarperCollins, 2017, 
 The Embattled Vote in America, Harvard University Press, 2018.
Repeal the Second Amendment: The Case for a Safer America, St. Martin's Press, 2020, 
 Thirteen Cracks: Repairing American Democracy after Trump, Rowman & Littlefield, 2021,

References

External links

 
 Allan Lichtman's biography from American University
 Allan Lichtman Announces Candidacy (WTOP)
 Despite Keys, Obama Is No Lock
 Keys to the White House' Historian Responds"
 
 "Professor who called Trump election now predicts impeachment", video on YouTube, via the CBS News official channel

1947 births
20th-century American Jews
American political scientists
American University faculty and staff
Brandeis University alumni
Candidates in the 2016 United States elections
Harvard University alumni
Living people
People from Bethesda, Maryland
People from Brownsville, Brooklyn
Polling
Stuyvesant High School alumni
21st-century American Jews